The 2005 CONCACAF Gold Cup was the eighth edition of the Gold Cup, the soccer championship of North America, Central America and the Caribbean (CONCACAF). It was contested in the United States in July 2005. The United States emerged victorious in the final against an upstart Panama team led by tournament MVP Luis Tejada. After regulation and 30 minutes of extra time ended scoreless, the USA won 3–1 on penalties.

For this edition, the format was switched from four groups of three teams each to the three groups of four teams. As a result, there was one more group stage game for each team, and the likelihood of teams advancing on a coin toss was much less. The top two teams from each group and the two best third-place teams would advance to the quarterfinals.

As usual for the Gold Cup, several of the top teams fielded less than their top squads, including guest teams Colombia and South Africa. Mexico and the United States were missing at least half their usual starters, and a few top name players on smaller nations (Paulo Wanchope and Amado Guevara, among others) also declined to participate. During the tournament, matches in Miami's Group A had to be postponed because of Hurricane Dennis.

This was the last edition of the tournament to have guest participants from other confederations.

Qualified teams

Venues

Squads

The 12 national teams involved in the tournament were required to register a squad of 23 players; only players in these squads were eligible to take part in the tournament.

Group stage

Group A

Group B

Group C

Ranking of third-placed teams

Knockout stage

Bracket

Quarter-finals

Semi-finals

Final

Statistics

Goalscorers
Three goals

 DaMarcus Beasley (Golden Boot Winner)
 Landon Donovan
 Carlos Ruiz
 Wilmer Velásquez
 Luis Tejada

Two goals

 Abel Aguilar
 Jairo Patiño
 Randall Brenes
 Jafet Soto
 Ricardo Fuller
 Jermaine Hue
 Jared Borgetti
 Jorge Dely Valdés
 Ricardo Phillips
 Lungisani Ndlela

One goal

 Ali Gerba
 Atiba Hutchinson
 Jaime Castrillon
 Héctor Hurtado
 Tressor Moreno
 Christian Bolaños
 Bryan Ruiz
 Alain Cervantes
 Maykel Galindo
 Lester More
 Gonzalo Romero
 Samuel Caballero
 Mario Ivan Guerrero
 Maynor Figueroa
 Milton Núñez
 Danilo Turcios
 Teafore Bennett
 Luton Shelton
 Damion Stewart
 Andy Williams
 Omar Bravo
 Gerardo Galindo
 Gonzalo Pineda
 Alberto Medina
 Francisco Rodríguez
 Philip Evans
 Elrio Van Heerden
 Solace Nkosi
 Siyabango Nomvete
 Abram Raselemane
 Marvin Andrews
 Chris Birchall
 Cornell Glen
 Clint Dempsey
 John O'Brien
 Oguchi Onyewu
 Josh Wolff

Awards

Winners

Individual awards

References

 Full match details at RSSF.com
 Match details at WorldFootball.net

 
Gold Cup
CONCACAF Gold Cup 2005
CONCACAF Gold Cup
CONCACAF Gold Cup tournaments